Ladnun railway station is a railway station in Nagaur district, Rajasthan. Its code is LAU. It serves Ladnun town. The station consists of two platforms. Passenger, Express, and Superfast trains halt here.

Trains

The following trains halt at Ladnun railway station in both directions:

 Bandra Terminus–Jammu Tawi Vivek Express
 Jodhpur–Delhi Sarai Rohilla Superfast Express
 Salasar Express
 Bhagat Ki Kothi–Kamakhya Express
 Bandra Terminus–Hisar Superfast Express
  Howrah Barmer superfast Biweekly express
  jodhpur rewari express 
 Merta Road Ratangarh/churu passenger 
  jammu Tawi - Bandra vivek express 
  Hisar -Bandra Termins express 
 Barmer-Howrah express
  Delhi sarai rohilla -Johdpur superfast express 
  Jodhpur- Hissar Express 
  Rewari- Jodhpur express 
  Hisar- Johdpur express 
  Churu/Ratangarh-Merta Road passenger

References

Railway stations in Nagaur district
Jodhpur railway division